Cockblock (or cock block) is a slang term for an action, whether intentional or not, that prevents someone else from having sex. Such behavior is said to be motivated by jealousy or competitiveness, although it is sometimes accidental or inadvertent. The term is also used (or the term "cockblocker") for a person who engages in such obstruction or intervention.

Social research has documented norms among male peer groups that view "cockblock" behavior as negative, which may make men less likely to challenge each other's behavior or impede sexual access to women, sometimes even in cases of possible sexual assault or intimate partner violence. The term appears to date at least to 1972, when Edith Folb documented its use by urban black teenagers.

Marla Gibbs uses the phrase in the 1999 film Lost & Found.

See also 
 Blockers (film)
 Democracy Manifest video
 Friend zone
 The Dog in the Manger
 Third wheel

References 

Seduction
Sexual slang